Aventura may refer to:

 Aventura (band), a bachata music group from the Bronx, New York
 Aventura (TV series), a 1970 Mexican telenovela
 Aventura, Florida, a city on the Florida coast in Miami
 Aventura Mall, an upscale super-regional shopping mall in Aventura, Florida
 Aero Adventure Aventura, a home-built aircraft design
 Aventura (horse), a racehorse
 Aventura (manga), a manga series by Shin Midorikawa
 Aventuras AD, a Spanish video game producer, active from 1987 to 1992
 Aventura Stakes, a Thoroughbred horse race held in Florida
 Uma Aventura (TV series), a Portuguese TV series, aired from 2000 to 2007
 Aventura Technologies, an American technology company accused of selling Chinese goods to the US government yet claiming they were American goods
 Aventura (song), a 2019 a song by Lunay, Ozuna and Anuel AA

See also 
 Adventure (disambiguation)
 
 L'Avventura, a movie
 L'Avventura (album), a record
 Fiat Avventura, a car